Srinath (born July 18, 1973) is an Indian actor and director who has appeared in Tamil films.

Career
He worked as an assistant director with director Jeeva, who gave him a break as an actor with films like Ullam Ketkumae (2005) and Unnale Unnale (2007). He is friend of Tamil actor Vijay since college days and has worked with him in several films.

Filmography
All films are in Tamil, unless otherwise noted.

Actor

Director
 Muthirai (2009)
 Vallavanukku Pullum Aayudham (2014)

Television
 2007-2008: Kadhalikka Neramillai

References

External links 
 

Indian male film actors
Tamil male actors
Indian male television actors
Living people
Film directors from Chennai
Tamil film directors
Tamil comedians
Filmfare Awards South winners
1968 births
Indian male comedians
Male actors from Chennai
21st-century Indian male actors
Male actors in Tamil cinema